The Dongquan Lighthouse or Dongju Island Lighthouse is a lighthouse on Dongju Island, Juguang Township, Lienchiang County, Fujian Province, Republic of China (Taiwan).

History

The lighthouse was built by the British Empire in 1872 to guide ships to Fuzhou during the Qing Dynasty when they were forced to open up along with four other treaty ports for trading. It was designated as a second-grade historic site in 1988 by the Ministry of the Interior. Until 2013, the lighthouse came under the administration of Customs Administration of the Ministry of Finance before it was changed to Maritime and Port Bureau of the Ministry of Transportation and Communications.

Architecture
The lighthouse is connected to the office annex building via a 30-meter long windbreak wall.

Features
The lighthouse features the Lighthouse Museum, opened in the English-style building in June 2008. An artist-in-residence program based at the lighthouse was established in June 2019.

Technical specification
It can cast a beam of light that can be seen up to 16.7 nautical miles away.

See also

 List of lighthouses in Taiwan
 List of tourist attractions in Taiwan

References

External links

 Maritime and Port Bureau MOTC

1872 establishments in China
2008 establishments in Taiwan
Juguang Township
Lighthouses in Lienchiang County
Lighthouses completed in 1872
Lighthouse museums
Museums established in 2008
Museums in Taiwan
National monuments of Taiwan